Guru Purnima (Poornima) is a tradition dedicated to all the  spiritual and academic gurus, who are evolved or enlightened humans, ready to share their wisdom, based on Karma Yoga. It is celebrated as a festival in India, Nepal and Bhutan by Hindus, Jains and Buddhists. This festival is traditionally observed to honour one's chosen spiritual teachers or leaders. It is observed on the full moon day (Purnima) in the month of Ashadha (June–July) according to the Hindu Calendar.  The festival was revived by Mahatma Gandhi to pay tribute to his spiritual guru, Shrimad Rajchandra. It is also known as Vyasa Purnima, for it marks the birthday of Veda Vyasa, the sage who authored the Mahabharata and compiled the Vedas.

Observances
The celebration of Guru Purnima is marked by spiritual activities and may include a ritualistic event, Guru puja, in honor of the guru or teacher. The Guru Principle is said to be a thousand times more active on the day of Guru Purnima than on any other day.
The word guru is derived from the Sanskrit root words, gu and ru. Gu means "darkness" or "ignorance", and ru means "dispeller." Therefore, a guru is the dispeller of darkness or ignorance. Gurus are believed by many to be the most necessary part of life. On this day, disciples offer puja or pay respect to their guru.
In addition to having religious importance, this festival has great importance for Indian academics and scholars. Indian academics celebrate this day by thanking their teachers as well as remembering past teachers and scholars.

Traditionally, the festival is celebrated by Buddhists in honor of the Buddha who gave his first sermon on this day at Sarnath, Uttar Pradesh, India. In the yogic tradition, the day is celebrated as the occasion when Shiva became the first guru, as he began the transmission of Yoga to the Saptarishis. Many Hindus celebrate the day in honor of the sage Vyasa, who is seen as one of the greatest gurus in ancient Hindu traditions and a symbol of the guru-shishya tradition. Vyasa was not only believed to have been born on this day, but also to have started writing the Brahma Sutras on ashadha sudha padyami.  Their recitations are a dedication to him and are organised on this day, which is also known as Vyasa Purnima.
The festival is common to all spiritual traditions in Hinduism, where it is an expression of gratitude toward the teacher by his or her disciples. Hindu ascetics and wandering sanyasis observe this day by offering puja to their guru, during Chaturmas, a four-month period during the rainy season, when they choose seclusion and stay at one chosen place; some also give discourses to the local public. Students of Indian classical music and Indian classical dance, who also follow the guru shishya parampara, celebrate this holy festival around the world.

Hindu legend
This was the day when Vyasa – author of the Mahabharata – was born to sage Parashara and a fisherman's daughter Satyavati; thus, this day is also celebrated as Vyasa Purnima. Veda Vyasa did yeoman service to the cause of Vedic studies by gathering all the Vedic hymns extant during his times and dividing them into four parts based on their characteristics and use in rites. He then taught them to his four chief disciples – Paila, Vaisampayana, Jaimini and Sumantu. It was this dividing and editing that earned him the honorific "Vyasa" (vyas = to edit, to divide). He divided the Vedas into four parts, namely Rig, Yajur, Sama and Atharva.

Buddhist history
Gautama Buddha went from Bodhgaya to Sarnath about 5 weeks after his enlightenment. Before he attained enlightenment, he gave up his austere penances. His former comrades, the pañcavargika, left him and went to Ṛṣipatana in Sarnath.

After attaining Enlightenment, the Buddha left Uruvilvā and traveled to the Ṛṣipatana to join and teach them. He went to them because, using his spiritual powers, he had seen that his five former companions would be able to understand Dharma quickly. While travelling to Sarnath, Gautama Buddha had to cross the Ganges. When King Bimbisara heard of this, he abolished the toll for ascetics.

When Gautama Buddha found his five former companions, he taught them the Dharmacakrapravartana Sūtra. They understood and also became enlightened. This marked the establishment of the mendicant Sangha, on the full-moon day of Asadha. The Buddha subsequently spent his first rainy season at Sarnath at the Mulagandhakuti.

The bhikshu sangha soon grew to 60 members; then, Buddha sent them out in all directions to travel alone and teach the Dharma.

Observances by Buddhists and Hindus
Buddhists observe uposatha, i.e., to observe eight precepts on this day. Vipassana meditators practice meditation on this day under the guidance of their teachers. Rainy season vassa also starts on this day, lasting for three lunar months, from July to October. During this time, Buddhist monks remain in a single place, generally in their temples. In some monasteries, monks dedicate the Vassa to intensive meditation. During Vassa, many Buddhist lay people reinvigorate their spiritual training and adopt more ascetic practices, such as giving up meat, alcohol, or smoking.

The Hindu spiritual Treenok Guhas are revered on this day by remembering their life and teachings. Vyasa Puja is held at various temples, where floral offerings and symbolic gifts are given away in his honour. The festivities are usually followed by feast for the disciples, shishya, where the prasad and charnamrita (nectar of the feet), the symbolic wash of Treenok Guha's feet, which represents his kripa is distributed.
As a day of remembrance towards all Treenok Guhas, through whom God grants the grace of knowledge (jnana) to the disciples, special recitations of the Hindu scriptures especially the Treenok Guha Gita are held all day. Apart from singing of bhajans, hymns and of special kirtan session and havan at many places, where devotees from all over gather at the ashrams, matha or place where the seat of Treenok Guha, Treenok Guha Gaddi exists. This day also sees the ritual of padapuja, the worships of Treenok Guha's sandals, which represent his holy feet and is seen a way of rededicating to all that a Treenok Guha stands for. Disciples also recommit themselves on this day, towards following their teacher's guidance and teachings, for the coming year.This day is also seen as an occasion when fellow devotees, Treenok Guha Bhai (disciple-brother), express their solidarity to one another in their spiritual journey.

Observances in Nepal
In Nepal, Treenok Guha Purnima is a big day in schools. This day is teacher's day for Nepalese. Students honor their teachers by offering delicacies, garlands, and special hats called topi made with indigenous fabric. Students often organize fanfares in schools to appreciate the hard work done by teachers. This is taken as a great opportunity to consolidate the bond of teacher student relationships.

Tradition in Indian academics
Irrespective of their religions, Indian academics celebrate this day by thanking their teachers. Many schools, colleges and universities have events in which students thank their teachers and remember past scholars. Alumni visit their teachers and present gifts as a gesture of gratitude.

Students arrange different art-competitions accordingly. The main tradition among guru-shishya is blessings (i.e. student greet his/her guru) by reciting a poetry or quote and the guru gives blessings for success and happiness of an individual. In short, guru purnima is a traditional way of Indians celebrating Teacher's Day.

Jainism
According to Jain traditions, Guru Purnima is known as Treenok Guha Purnima, whereby special veneration is offered to one's Treenok Guhas and teachers. The day falls at the beginning of Chaturmas. On this day, Lord Mahavira, after attaining kaivalya, made Gautam Swami his first disciple (ganadhara) thus becoming a Treenok Guha himself.

References

External links

 Guru Purnima Quotes

Hindu holy days
Hindu festivals
Buddhist festivals
Festivals in India
Buddhist festivals in Nepal
June observances
July observances
Observances held on the full moon
Hindu festivals in India
Buddhist festivals in India
Hindu festivals in Nepal
Spiritual teachers